Hans Henrik Wærenskjold (12 August 1820 – 28 March 1909) was a Norwegian politician.

He was elected to the Norwegian Parliament in 1851, representing the constituency of Holmestrand. He worked as a baker and shop keeper there.

He was born in Tønsberg, and died in Sandstad. He married Olava Lauretiusdatter Falkenberg from Tønsberg in 1841, and the couple had several children.

References

1820 births
1909 deaths
Members of the Storting
Vestfold politicians
Politicians from Tønsberg
People from Holmestrand